Wolfgang Losack (22 April 1922 – 24 July 1989) was a German sports shooter. He competed in the 50 metre pistol event at the 1960 Summer Olympics.

References

1922 births
1989 deaths
German male sport shooters
Olympic shooters of the United Team of Germany
Shooters at the 1960 Summer Olympics
Sportspeople from Leipzig